Stanley, or Chek Chue, is a coastal town and a popular tourist attraction in Hong Kong. It is located on a peninsula on Hong Kong Island. It is east of Repulse Bay and west of Shek O, adjacent to Chung Hom Kok and Tai Tam. Administratively, it is part of the Southern District.

The Chinese name "Chek Chue" refers to the original village-town but "Stanley" generally refers to all the surrounding areas of the peninsula on Hong Kong Island.

Name

There are two possible origins of the name "Chek Chue".

Legend has it that the notorious pirate Cheung Po Tsai was active in Stanley. That is why the district became known in Cantonese as Chak Chue. There was once a Cheung Po Tsai Cave near the Tin Hau Temple west of Stanley, but the cave was filled in the early 1950s.

The original Cantonese name of the village was believed to be based on a big tall cotton tree (Bombax malabaricum, Bombax ceiba ) often covered with bright red blossoms at the time, hence red pillar in Hakka language.

It was given an English name after Lord Stanley (subsequently Earl of Derby), British Colonial Secretary at the time of the cession of Hong Kong to the United Kingdom, and subsequently Prime Minister.

History
After the annexation of Hong Kong in 1842, the British made Stanley the temporary administrative centre, before moving it to the newly founded Victoria City. Present-day Stanley Fort was where British and Canadian troops mounted a last stand during the Battle of Hong Kong. The survivors surrendered to Japanese forces in December 1941. The fort, which was the former British Army barracks in Stanley, is now occupied by the People's Liberation Army following the handover of Hong Kong to the People's Republic of China in 1997.

Places of interest

Stanley Market and Pat Kan Uk

Stanley Market is situated in Stanley New Street near the Stanley food market. It is an array of small shops and street stalls.

Pat Kan Uk is a row of eight houses. Many people think they are abandoned pre-war buildings but each of them is still a home to local elders. There were eight houses belonging to farming families in Wong Ma Kok before the Sino-Japanese War. The government recovered the land to develop barracks and a terrace of eight houses was built here as relocation homes for the local residents.

Stanley Main Street
Stanley has many bars and restaurants on its waterfront along Stanley Main Street.

To the west of Stanley Main Street, past the amphitheatre in Stanley Plaza is the Tin Hau Temple (Temple of the Queen of Heaven). Built by Cheung Po Tsai in 1767, it is one of the oldest temples in Hong Kong.

Murray House

Murray House is a Victorian-era building originally built in the present-day business district of Central in 1846 as officers' quarters of the Murray Barracks, the building was relocated to Stanley during the 2000s.

Stanley Plaza 
Adjacent to Murray House and Lung Tak Court, Stanley Plaza opened in 2001. It includes a shopping arcade and an outdoor community amphitheatre. The complex is owned by The Link REIT. Numerous free concerts and events are held in the amphitheatre throughout the year. In November 2011, Stanley Plaza reopened after a major renovation which was part of the transfer from government ownership to Link REIT ownership. A number of Asian and western restaurants, a good supermarket, Starbucks, McDonald's and a variety of shops can be found in Stanley Plaza. Well integrated with the Stanley Main Street waterfront and historic Murray House, Stanley Plaza provides convenient access to nearby tourist spots such as Tin Hau Temple and Stanley Ma Hang Park.

Stanley's beaches

Stanley is famous for its two beaches: Stanley Main Beach, located on the eastern side of the peninsula, and St. Stephen's Beach, on the western side. Both beaches are sandy and have areas designed for barbecues. Like many beaches in Hong Kong, they also have netted perimeters to protect swimmers from sharks.

The larger of the two beaches - Stanley Main Beach, which is also popular with windsurfers and other watersport enthusiasts, hosts the Stanley Dragon Boat Championships each year in June to celebrate the Tuen Ng Festival.

There is a Water Sports Training Centre run by the Government located at Stanley Main Beach. Courses are offered at reasonable prices and are very popular.

St. Stephen's College

St. Stephen's College is a primary and secondary school that has been located in Stanley for over 100 years. It has both day students and boarding facilities. Originally a private school, St. Stephen's College became a government-funded public school during the late 1900s.
The college's oldest building, the School House, was declared a monument in 2011, being one of the few schools in Hong Kong to own a Declared Monument in its campus.

Correctional Services Department (CSD) Complex

Stanley Prison is a maximum security level correctional facility, established in 1937, that houses the most hardened of criminals from the Hong Kong Judicial System. The Pak Sha Wan Correctional Institution (a medium security institution established in 1999) and the Tung Tau Correctional Institution (a minimum security institution established in 1982) are all part of the overall Hong Kong Correctional Services Department complex in Stanley. Nearby on Stanley Village Road is the Ma Hang Prison (a minimum security institution established in 1974) which houses male adult prisoners and clinically old prisoners of low security risk.

The CSD Staff Training Institute is also located in Stanley. It is responsible for planning and implementing training programmes to equip CSD staff with relevant knowledge.

The Correctional Services Museum is located at the entrance to the CSD complex in Stanley. It is open from 10:00 am to 5:00 pm daily except Mondays and public holidays. The Museum's collection has over 680 artefacts in nine galleries occupying some 480 square metres. Admission to the museum is free of charge.

Ma Hang Park

Stanley Ma Hang Park opened on 17 January 2011. The park has an area of 50,000 square-meters featuring various thematic zones to cater for people of all ages and interests. Pedestrian paths have been improved to enable safe and easy access to the various thematic zones, with display boards set up to introduce the birds, butterflies and plant species found in the park. Pak Tai Temple is also a part of the park. It was built in 1805 when Stanley was a major fishing village, and dedicated to the "protector of fishermen".

Other areas of interest in Stanley

 The Stanley Military Cemetery is located near St. Stephen's Beach.
 The Old Stanley Police Station, built in 1859 is a declared monument of Hong Kong. Today it retains the original architecture, but inside it houses a ParknShop Supermarket.
 Blake Pier at Stanley
 The Stanley Municipal Building opened in the summer of 2006. It houses some government offices, a medium-sized branch of the Hong Kong Public Library containing both English and Chinese books. It also houses several recreational rooms such as basketball and badminton courts. There is a "garden zone" on the roof of the library section of the building with a view of Stanley Harbour.
The Stanley Fort is a PLA military barracks located at the southernmost part of Stanley peninsula, south of the lighthouse. It is not open to tourists or to the public.

Education
 The  is located in Stanley.

Stanley is in Primary One Admission (POA) School Net 18. Within the school net are multiple aided schools (operated independently but funded with government money) and Hong Kong Southern District Government
Primary School.

Public housing

Ma Hang Estate 

Ma Hang Estate is a public housing estate in Stanley. Formerly the site of Ma Hang Squatter Area, the estate is designed as "working village" and consists of 5 residential blocks completed between 1993 and 2000 for providing in-site rehousing for squatters. Stanley Plaza, Murray House and Blake Pier at Stanley are also the territories of Ma Hang Estate.

Lung Yan Court 

Lung Yan Court is a Home Ownership Scheme court in Stanley, next to Ma Hang Estate. Formerly the site of Ma Hang Squatter Area, the court has two blocks built in 1993.

Lung Tak Court 

Lung Tak Court was originally planned for rental housing, but it was later converted to HOS court for sale. it consists of 4 blocks built in 2000. Owners who have paid the land premium may rent their premises out in the open market. Apartments in this area offers an attractive alternative to living in the more built up areas like Wanchai or North Point because there is much more greenery and open spaces around and buildings in Stanley are low rises. It is considered to be very convenient because it is located right next to Stanley Plaza and to the transport interchange.

Transport

Stanley is served by several bus routes along Repulse Bay Road and Tai Tam Road. It is easy to reach with several buses that go back and forth from all over Hong Kong, for example the bus routes 6, 6A, 6X, 66 and 260 (Citybus) from Central Exchange Square, the bus route 973 from Tsim Sha Tsui in Kowloon, the bus route 73 from Cyberport and 63 from Causeway Bay, as well as a bus from Chai Wan. In addition to the many bus routes, Stanley is also served by a taxi stand. The taxis in Stanley are red colour taxis.

The number 40 green minibus runs 24 hours a day. The terminus in Causeway Bay is located in Jardine's Crescent, just opposite SOGO Department Store.

There is no direct MTR route serving the Stanley area directly. The South Island MTR Line provides an alternative option for Stanley, as passengers can use the Ocean Park station (MTR) to connect to different areas in Hong Kong and change to bus and minibus services to avoid traffic congestion in north Hong Kong island and Aberdeen Tunnel. People in Stanley can also connect to the Chai Wan MTR station by bus or number 16 minibus.

Demographics
According to The Wall Street Journal in a 2015 article, Stanley has a "a sizeable French population." This population was reported to have come in the late 2000s and early 2010s and consisted of young professional French people.

See also
 Beaches of Hong Kong
 List of places in Hong Kong
 Tourism in Hong Kong
 Maryknoll House (Stanley)

References

External links

 Strolling Around Stanley Market

 More pictures of Stanley